"Torm" is a song performed by Estonian singer Jüri Pootsmann. The song was released as a digital download on 31 May 2015 through Universal Music Group as the lead single from his self-titled extended play. The song peaked at number 7 on the Estonian Airplay Chart.

Track listing

Chart performance

Release history

References

2015 songs
2015 debut singles
Jüri Pootsmann songs